The 45th edition of the Vuelta a Colombia, a bicycle stage race was held from April 18 to May 1, 1995. There were a total number of 111 competitors.

Stages

1995-04-18: Paipa — Paipa (6.2 km)

1995-04-19: Duitama — Villa de Leiva (177.3 km)

1995-04-20: Villa de Leiva — Pacho (198.1 km)

1995-04-21: Funza — Mariquita (157.1 km)

1995-04-22: Honda — Manizales (143.7 km)

1995-04-23: Manizales — Santa Helena del Opón (214.2 km)

1995-04-23: Caldas — Palestina (172.3 km)

1995-04-25: Pereira — Cali (206.5 km)

1995-04-26: Cali — Buenaventura (127.8 km)

1995-04-27: Buenaventura — Buga (122.3 km)

1995-04-28: Buga — Armenia (187.6 km)

1995-04-29: Armenia — Ibagué (115.2 km)

1995-04-30: Ibagué — Santa Fé de Bogotá (213.7 km)

1995-05-01: Bogotá — Alto de Patios (26 km)

Final classification

Teams 

Pony Malta-Kelme PRF

Manzana Postobón PRF

Gasesosas Glacial

Aguardiante Antioqueño-Lotería de Medellín

Pony Malta–Avianca

Pilsener (Ecuador)

Manzana Postobón Aficionado

Cuba National Team

Agua Natural Glacial

Ron Medellín-Lotin

Todos por Boyacá

Cicloases-Cundinamarca

See also 
 1995 Clásico RCN

References 
 pedalesybielas (Archived 2009-10-21)
 cyclingwebsite

Vuelta a Colombia
Colombia
Vuelta Colombia